Laura Deming (born 1994) is a venture capitalist. Her work focuses on life extension, and using biological research to reduce or reverse the effects of aging.

Education
Laura Deming is the daughter of John and Tabitha Deming; she grew up in New Zealand. Deming and her brother, Trey, were homeschooled; she says she taught herself "calculus and probability and statistics, and French literature and history". At age 8, Deming became interested in the biology of aging, and at age 12 she joined the lab of Cynthia Kenyon at the University of California, San Francisco. Kenyon successfully increased the lifespan of the worm C. elegans by a factor of ten through genetic engineering. Deming was accepted to MIT at age 14 and studied physics, but later dropped out to accept the $100,000 Thiel Fellowship and start a venture capital firm. Deming was one of only two women in the 2011 initial class of Thiel Fellows.

Career
Deming is a partner at and founder of The Longevity Fund, a venture capital firm focused on aging and life extension. The firm raised $4 million in its first fund and $22 million for its second fund, in 2017. The Longevity Fund investments include Unity Biotechnology, which develops senolytic drugs targeting diseases of aging, Navitor Pharmaceuticals, and Metacrine.

Deming believes that science can be used to create biological immortality in humans, and has said that ending aging "is a lot closer than you might think". She has been featured in "30 Under 30" by Forbes magazine, and was one of the stars of "The Age of Ageing", a documentary by National Geographic television channel. She also spoke at the 2012 Singularity Summit and at the 2013 TEDMED conference.

In 2018, Deming launched Age1, a four-month startup accelerator program focused on founders creating longevity companies. The program graduated its first class of six on October 10, 2018, with companies including Fauna Bio, a startup using the biology of hibernation to aid in heart attack and stroke recovery, and Spring Discovery, focused on accelerating aging therapeutic research with machine learning. In August 2018, Deming also began advising the newly launched Pioneer, a fund designed to find talent and "lost Einsteins" around the world, for projects in longevity.

See also
 Calico (company)
 SENS Research Foundation

References

External links
The Longevity Fund
Longevity FAQ

Life extensionists
New Zealand businesspeople
1994 births
Living people
Thiel fellows
American venture capitalists